Josef Jiří Kolár (9 December 1812 – 31 January 1896) was a Czech theatrical actor, director, translator, and writer.

Early life 
He was born Josef Kolář (later also spelled Kollar or Kolar) in Prague as the last of three sons to a family of a clothes trader who had twelve children altogether. His parents gave him good education which he broadened at schools so that he could read Homer in Greek before university. He also learned German, French, Italian and English. He started studying philosophy (influenced by Augustin Smetana), natural science and philology at Charles University in 1830 and became interested in the Czech revival movement. He interrupted the studies in 1833 when he became a tutor to a Hungarian noble family in Pest. There he studied medicine and made friends with Ján Kollár. Once he had an argument with a Hungarian nobleman about Hungarian and Slavic languages which ended up with a duel – Kolár was seriously injured and spent several weeks in bed. He also travelled a great deal in Western Europe. He added the middle name Jiří to his name for his admiration for George Gordon Byron.

Theatrical career 
After three years Kolár had to return to Prague, where he continued studying at the university. He became acquainted with Josef Kajetán Tyl, who kindled his interest in theatre. Kolár's first amateur role was in Hadrian z Římsů by Václav Kliment Klicpera. He played the part of the recently deceased Karel Hynek Mácha. In 1837, Kolár was engaged in the Estates Theatre, and from 1842 appeared also in German language plays. He also became director of Czech drama at the Theatre in Rose Street (Divadlo v Růžové ulici) and translated and directed several plays by Shakespeare and Schiller.

Kolár's translation of The Taming of the Shrew (1846) was the first translation of that play into the Czech language. In 1848 Kolár was arrested and briefly held in prison. When Tyl left the Estates Theatre in 1851, Kolár became the leading personality of the theatre.

In 1853 the success of Kolár's translation of Shakespeare's Hamlet led him to plan with his pupil Jakub Malý a systematic translation into Czech of all of Shakespeare's plays, to be published by the Bohemian Museum. Kolár himself provided translations of four plays, Maly eleven, František Doucha and Jan Josef Čejka nine each, and Ladislav Čelakovský (the son of František Ladislav Čelakovský) four. The project was completed in 1872.

In 1859 Kolár was nominated as director of the Czech stage, but after the Czech part of the theatre became independent in the Provisional Theatre in 1862, Kolár stayed in the German ensemble of the Estates Theatre. In 1866 he became chief director of the Provisional Theatre where he directed especially operas. In 1881 he became a literary manager in the National Theatre.

Friendship with Augustin Smetana 
In 1844 Kolár became a friend of Augustin Smetana, a Hegelian philosopher and later (1850) excommunicated priest. He turned his attention to philosophy again and took part in the meetings with Augustin Smetana in his apartment, where among guests were Anton Springer, Vincenc Náhlovský, Michael František von Canaval, and Bernard Bolzano.

Anna Marta Manetinská 
Kolár married actress Anna Manetinská. Born in Pest in 1817, Manetinská was the daughter of a Prague and Pest actor and singer. She returned to Prague with her mother and was sent to a convent to be brought up. At the age of eight she started playing child roles in a theatre in the apartment of her grandmother and was later taken from the convent to be involved in theatre life. In 1834 she became a member of the ensemble in Estates Theatre. She was German but the leaders of the theatre persuaded her to learn Czech and play in Czech theatre. She became beloved by the Czech audience. She and Kolár married in 1834. Their daughter Augusta was a piano player.

Roles

References 

1812 births
1896 deaths
Male actors from Prague
People from the Kingdom of Bohemia
Czech male stage actors
Czech male writers
Translators of William Shakespeare
19th-century male actors
19th-century translators